Samuel "Sammy" Jack Claphan (October 10, 1956 – November 26, 2001) was an offensive lineman in the National Football League. Claphan attended high school at Stilwell High School in Stilwell, Oklahoma. He played his way to All-American status in 1974.  He was recruited by Head Coach Barry Switzer to play at the University of Oklahoma. Claphan died of a heart attack on November 26, 2001.

Career
Sam Claphan played on the 1974 and 1975 National Championship teams. He was the starting lineman for the Oklahoma Sooners from 1975–1978. At 6' 7" and 295 lbs, Claphan was the largest player on the team. He was drafted in the second round of the 1979 NFL Draft (47th overall pick) by the Cleveland Browns but failed to make the roster due to a preseason injury. He was picked up by the San Diego Chargers in 1980.

Claphan played longer in the NFL than any other University of Oklahoma lineman. He was a starting offensive tackle for the San Diego Chargers, protecting the blind side of Hall of Fame quarterback Dan Fouts. He was with the Chargers from 1981-1987 until he retired. Claphan, a Cherokee, was inducted into the American Indian Athletic Hall of Fame in 1994.

References

External links
Charger Career stats

1956 births
2001 deaths
People from Tahlequah, Oklahoma
Cherokee Nation sportspeople
Players of American football from Oklahoma
American football offensive guards
American football offensive tackles
Oklahoma Sooners football players
San Diego Chargers players
20th-century Native Americans